The 2008–09 Bangladeshi cricket season featured Test series between Bangladesh and New Zealand, and between Bangladesh and Sri Lanka.

Honours
 National Cricket League – Rajshahi Division
 One-Day League – Barisal Division
 Most runs – Faisal Hossain 775 @ 51.66 (HS 129)
 Most wickets – Suhrawadi Shuvo 59 @ 17.71 (BB 6/71)

Test series

New Zealand played two Test matches and three One Day Internationals in Bangladesh in October 2008, winning one Test and two ODIs. The other Test was drawn, and Bangladesh won the remaining ODI. Sri Lanka also played two Tests in Bangladesh in December 2008 and January 2009, winning both. They were also involved in a triangular ODI tournament with Bangladesh and Zimbabwe. Sri Lanka beat Bangladesh in the final.

See also
 History of cricket in Bangladesh

Further reading
 Wisden Cricketers' Almanack 2008

External sources
 Miscellaneous articles re Bangladesh cricket
 CricInfo re Bangladesh
 CricketArchive re tournaments in Bangladesh in 2008–09

2008 in Bangladeshi cricket
2009 in Bangladeshi cricket
Bangladeshi cricket seasons from 2000–01
Domestic cricket competitions in 2008–09